Bennie Green Blows His Horn is an album by American trombonist Bennie Green. It was recorded in 1955 and released on the Prestige label.

Reception

The AllMusic review by Scott Yanow stated that "Green and his band show that there is no reason that swinging jazz has to be viewed as overly intellectual and esoteric... a fine example of Bennie Green's talents and winning musical personality."

Track listing
All compositions by Bennie Green, except where indicated.
 "Sometimes I'm Happy" (Vincent Youmans, Irving Caesar) – 3:53
 "Laura" (David Raksin, Johnny Mercer) – 6:13
 "Body and Soul" (Edward Heyman, Robert Sour, Frank Eyton, Johnny Green) – 6:58
 "Say Jack!" (Green, Osie Johnson) – 3:36
 "One Track" (Green, Johnson) – 3:15
 "Groovin' the Blues" [Take 1] – 5:31
 "Groovin' the Blues" [Take 2] – 3:13
 "Travelin' Light" (Harry Akst, Sidney Clare) – 3:07
 "Hi-Yo Silver" (Green, Johnson) – 3:21

Recorded on June 10, 1955 (tracks 1-4) and September 22, 1955 (tracks 5-9).

Personnel
Bennie Green – trombone, vocals
Charlie Rouse – tenor saxophone
Cliff Smalls – piano
Paul Chambers – bass
Osie Johnson – drums
Candido Camero – conga (tracks 1-4)

References 

Prestige Records albums
Bennie Green albums
1955 albums
Albums recorded at Van Gelder Studio